Zodiac is the name of different groups of fictional characters appearing in American comic books published by Marvel Comics.

Publication history
The first version of the Zodiac made up of humans appears in The Avengers #72 (Jan. 1970) and was created by Roy Thomas and Sal Buscema.

The second version of the Zodiac made up of androids first appears in The Defenders #49 (July 1977) and was created by David Anthony Kraft and Keith Giffen.

The third version of the Zodiac made up of humans first appears in the second volume of Alpha Flight and was created by Steven T. Seagle (writer), Scott Clark (penciler), and Chris Carlson (inker).

The fourth version of the Zodiac first appears in New Warriors vol. 4 #4-5 (Nov.-Dec. 2007) and was created by Kevin Grevioux and Joe Caramagna.

The fifth version of the Zodiac first appears in Avengers Assemble vol. 2 #1 and was created by Brian Michael Bendis and Mark Bagley.

Fictional team history

First Zodiac (human)
The original Zodiac group debuts in the title the Avengers and is established as a criminal organization founded and funded by member Cornelius van Lunt (who adopts the identity of Taurus). The group's identity is based on the Western zodiac from astrology, with each member adopting the persona of a sign of the zodiac, being twelve in all. The group members share leadership of the organization, with the position rotating just as the astrological zodiac changes. When not united as a group, the members of Zodiac are all based in different cities throughout the United States. Dedicated to economic and political domination of the world, the group uses any means to accomplish this, including subversion; extortion and mass murder.

Lone member Scorpio is the first member to debut in the Marvel Universe, first appearing in the title Nick Fury, Agent of S.H.I.E.L.D. The character acquires a sentient extradimensional (from the Ankh dimension) artifact called the Zodiac Key, and attempts to assassinate S.H.I.E.L.D. director Nick Fury. The encounter ends with Scorpio apparently dying from a gunshot wound. The character reappears in the same title, and attempts to kill Fury once again, before being driven off by S.H.I.E.L.D. agents. It is eventually revealed that this was still the original villain, but resurrected in a Life Model Decoy body by the Zodiac Key.

Scorpio appears in the title Avengers and, after capturing the Avengers, reveals to the heroes the entire Zodiac. At this time Aries is team leader, and takes control of the Zodiac Key and acknowledges that Scorpio has redeemed himself for failing to kill Nick Fury. The Avengers are freed by fellow members Yellowjacket and the Wasp, and Scorpio is revealed to be Nick Fury in disguise. The villains flee, and Fury reveals that after learning that the original Scorpio was his brother, Jake Fury, he adopted the identity to draw out the other Zodiac members.

The Zodiac reappear in Avengers, with member Taurus attempting to extort local farmers for their land. Several Avengers, aided by the hero Red Wolf, prevent this and defeat Taurus. The title Daredevil features a plan by Zodiac (who are not revealed as the instigators until reappearing in Avengers) to cause civil unrest by inciting a street gang to violence in the borough of Manhattan in New York City. The plan is stopped by Daredevil and Avenger the Black Panther, with the two characters then featuring in title Avengers with the rest of the team to prevent a full-scale attack by Zodiac on Manhattan. Aries is killed when the Thunder God Thor destroys the character's escape craft.

Zodiac, now splintered, operate independently. Aquarius, Capricorn, and Sagittarius attempt to destroy Stark Industries by contracting assassin the Spymaster to kill Tony Stark, the alter ego of Iron Man. The attempt fails, and the Spymaster is contracted to capture Daredevil in revenge for his past interference. The Spymaster succeeds, and also captures mercenary Madame Masque. The Zodiac members then use the Zodiac Key to capture Nick Fury and Iron Man, and take all four captives to the Ankh dimension, where they hope to recharge the artifact. This plan fails, and the heroes defeat and capture the Zodiac members, although the Spymaster escapes. Member Gemini features in the Savage in the City storyline in the title Astonishing Tales and allies with villain the Plunderer in an attempt to steal the Super Soldier Formula (the same serum that empowers the character Captain America), but is defeated by the jungle hero Ka-Zar.

In the title Avengers, van Lunt reunites the Zodiac (including recruiting a new Aries), and together they plan to attack New York City with a weapon called the Star Blazer. The group encounter the Avengers once again and after a near defeat, Aries attempts to stage a coup and take power from Taurus. Aided by Zodiac member Libra, the Avengers successfully capture the other 11 members of the Zodiac. The character Libra reveals he only aided the heroes because Avenger Mantis is his daughter. The Avengers use, with van Lunt's cooperation, the Star Blazer against an alien threat.

Zodiac member Aquarius appears in the third volume of the title Ghost Rider, and after learning he has cancer attempts to make a bargain with a demon to save himself. Aquarius then attempts to take revenge on van Lunt, but the character's soul is claimed before he can do so. The second Aries makes a brief appearance in the title Captain America, and is used and killed by the alien invader Lucifer. Scorpio reappears in the title Defenders, and retrieves the Zodiac Key. After creating an android version of the Zodiac, Scorpio kidnaps the hero Nighthawk, hoping to ransom the character as his alter ego is Kyle Richmond, a wealthy entrepreneur. Nighthawk's teammates, the Defenders track Scorpio and encounter the android Zodiac. Discovering that three of his created Zodiac did not survive the process, a distraught Scorpio commits suicide. Taurus reappears in the title Iron Man, and orders the second Aquarius and third Aries to kill Iron Man (James Rhodes), but both are defeated and incarcerated. S.H.I.E.L.D are advised and begin to track van Lunt.

Second Zodiac (android)
An android version of the Zodiac first appeared in The Defenders #49 (July 1977). This android Zodiac features in the first The West Coast Avengers Annual, and are employed by former Avenger Quicksilver (under the control of the villain Maximus) to battle the Avengers; four of them battle the East Coast Avengers in Avengers Mansion, four of them battle the Avengers in a circus where Quicksilver had his first mission with the team, and four of them battle a makeshift team of Thor, Black Widow, Black Panther, Falcon, and James Rhodes in the Australian base where Quicksilver was once missing and presumed dead. The origin of this version of the Zodiac is revealed in the second volume of the title West Coast Avengers. Scorpio is resurrected in android form by the Zodiac Key once again and summons the remainder of the human Zodiac to a meeting, at which they are slaughtered by another android version of the entire group. Taurus escapes and seeks the protection of the West Coast Avengers, who have a series of skirmishes with the androids until the false Zodiac are transported to the Ankh dimension, where they are deactivated. Taurus, who had vowed to surrender to the authorities once the threat was over, attempted to escape and was killed in a plane crash during a struggle with Avenger Moon Knight. The limited series Avengers Forever reveals that Libra also escaped the massacre.

Third Zodiac (human)
A third, human version of the Zodiac briefly feature in the second volume of the title Alpha Flight. Their leader also calls himself Scorpio, and wields a weapon reminiscent of the original Zodiac Key. Hired by Department H, a division of the Canadian military, to test Alpha Flight in battle, the group is murdered by mutant task force Weapon X.

Fourth Zodiac
Several members of a mysterious fourth version of the Zodiac are mentioned in the title Young Avengers and appear in the fourth volume of the title New Warriors, and skirmish with heroes from the Initiative and New Warriors. Zodiac member Cancer murders New Warrior Longstrike. The villain Zodiac claims to have murdered all the members of this group and made their heads into hunting trophies.

Thanos' Zodiac
Thanos returns from the dead and forms his own incarnation of the Zodiac. In a plot to rule Earth, he had special suits made for the ambitious people that want to rule the world with one of them being Hood's cousin John King who became Cancer. When Thanos abandoned his Zodiac on the self-destructing Helicarrier, John King was the only one who survived and was interrogated about Thanos' plot. According to Captain America about the identity of some of the Zodiac members, he mentioned one of the Zodiac members was a former bodyguard of Kingpin, another Zodiac member formerly worked for Mandarin, and another was a HYDRA agent. Though Captain America did not say which of the Zodiac members were associated with these identities.

Zodiac Sects
As part of the "All-New, All-Different Marvel", a new incarnation of the Zodiac appears. This version has their Sects named after their Zodiac symbol. Their Leo Sect was shown speeding down the highways of Shanghai, China as they are being pursued by Spider-Man and Mockingbird in his new Spider-Mobile. Mockingbird told Nick Fury, Jr. that the Zodiac broke into Parker Industries' Shanghai branch and stole some servers which would allow them to hack into the Webware devices. As they swerve to avoid energy bolts, Spider-Man boasts of his superior driving skills. In the driver's seat of the Zodiacs' getaway car, Leo tells his Leo Sect grunts to take out the road. The Zodiac thugs blow up a car, destroying the road, but as they gloat the Spider-Mobile tails them, driving along the underside of the overpass. Cheered on by the citizens of Shanghai, Spider-Man switches the steering over to Mockingbird and opens the roof, addressing his fans in Mandarin, which he picked up taking his driving lessons. The Spider-Mobile's wheels unfold into insectoid legs and it flips over, cutting off the Zodiacs' escape. Spider-Man jumps onto the hood of their car, displaying a couple of the new webbing types he developed: micro-coiled Z-metal "Bug Zappers" capable of being electrified, and shock-absorbing expanding web-foam. The Zodiacs' car crashes and Spider-Man checks on the citizens to see if anyone is hurt. When one of them reprimands him for letting Zodiac's Leo Sect escape, Spider-Man states he is delegating their apprehension to Mockingbird, who knocks the grunts out and interrogates Leo as to why Zodiac has been trying to steal the Webware servers. Leo bites a suicide pill, but Spider-Man shoots him with an antidote he developed griping that he is tired of them killing themselves. Later on at Max Modell and Hector Baez' wedding, Zodiac's Pisces Sect emerges from the river. While Peter offers himself up as a distraction, Hobie Brown changes into his Spider-Man costume. The leader of the Pisces Sect reveals they are after Peter's Webware specifically, because it has access to restricted data caches. Disguised as Spider-Man, Hobie intervenes and Peter tells Sajani to help the wedding guests (who are former Horizon Labs employees) find cover. Hobie's lack of a Spider-Sense gets him knocked out of the fight and Peter realizes that he could be killed. Encrypting his Webware, he gives it to the Pisces Sect, who depart as the police arrive.

Spider-Man and the Prowler infiltrate the Aquarius Sect's underwater base as Pisces, Aquarius, and Cancer work to decrypt the Webware. When Spider-Man and the Prowler engage the three Zodiac members, Pisces uses her water powers on them as Pisces, Aquarius, and Cancer escape upon setting their underwater base to self-destruct. Spider-Man and the Prowler recover the Webware and exit the underwater base while Pisces, Aquarius, and Cancer exit in the escape pods. While contacting Mockingbird and Nick Fury Jr. of their status, Spider-Man learns that Leo is still being interrogated and has not snitched yet. Spider-Man says that they forced the Zodiac to send the encrypted data to all the Zodiac bases and sends Fury the location of all the Zodiac bases. Nick Fury Jr. states that they can now take the fight to the Zodiac before they can begin their next plot.

At the Zodiac's headquarters, Scorpio learns from Gemini that if the Zodiac keeps taking risks, then S.H.I.E.L.D. will win. Scorpio tells Aries and Taurus that they are moving out and to round up their troops. When Aries asks if he wants the best and brightest or red shirts, Scorpio states cannon fodder will suffice and that if they want results, they cannot care about the risks. The Zodiac later attacks a S.H.I.E.L.D. Helicarrier at the East China Sea where Mockingbird claims to Nick Fury Jr. that Scorpio might be his uncle. Scorpio breaks into the holding area where Leo is being held. Leo informs him that he did not tell S.H.I.E.L.D. anything. Scorpio applauds Leo's loyalty to the cause, but states that the attack was not a rescue mission. As Leo expresses confusion, Scorpio blasts him with the Zodiac Key, reducing his body to a pile of ashes as he coldly states that Leo failed his mission and failed to kill himself. Scorpio then orders the Zodiac troops to retreat into the ocean where the Pisces Sect's ships are waiting.

In an unknown location, Scorpio and the Geminis are looking at the stars. The Geminis tell Scorpio that if he goes on with his plans, he will succeed. If he forces S.H.I.E.L.D.'s hand tonight, their ally Spider-Man will abandon them. Scorpio decides to strike now and tells them to inform all their houses that it is time. During this time, S.H.I.E.L.D., Human Torch, and the Prowler are preparing to attack the Zodiac bases. While Nick Fury Jr. is annoyed that Spider-Man was detoured about the Goblin Nation's War Goblins attack on Nadua, S.H.I.E.L.D. begins attacking the Zodiac bases where nobody has found Scorpio yet.

It was later revealed that the Zodiac bases that were attacked were all fake. There was even a mentioning that S.H.I.E.L.D. was unable to remove Leo's mask. At the British Museum, Scorpio and the Zodiac storm the place, being spotted by a camera. Scorpio is using the Zodiac Key to look for his price when Spider-Man, the Human Torch, Mockingbird and the Prowler crash through a window and the heroes and various S.H.I.E.L.D. agents fight the Zodiac. Spider-Man and Mockingbird go after Scorpio, but are stopped by Sagittarius who claims to be the world greatest archer. While Mockingbird takes care of him, Spider-Man confronts Scorpio, who destroys the Rosetta Stone and takes what is inside: a strange artifact with the Zodiac Key symbol. Scorpio tells him that the game is over now, meaning he has no use for his pawns and uses a Webware to activate the venom samples in all of the Zodiac members. Spider-Man jumps into action and manages to hit all of the Zodiac with the antidote before they die while Scorpio uses this moment to escape. The Zodiac Key is held in the apartment of a man named Mr. Jacobs alongside his Scorpio gear.

When the planets that are shown in the Zodiac Grand Orrery get into alignment, Scorpio traveled back to his base in France. Spider-Man tracked the hacked satellite signal back to Vernon Jacobs' building. While in the Channel Tunnel, he transformed two of its staff members into becoming his next Cancer and Leo. While Spider-Man called his allies, Scorpio crashed the transmission stating that he will use his influence on Parker Industries enough to have it sink into the ground.

On his way to the Royal Observatory in Greenwich, Scorpio transforms two other people into Pisces and Taurus. At the Royal Observatory, Scorpio places the Zodiac Grand Orrery in the prime meridian there and performed a ritual that opened a secret passageway underground. Spider-Man and his allies arrived to stop Scorpio. When Scorpio steps into the door, he sees a year filled with events like Skyspear, Norman Osborn's latest activity, Regent's plot, the "New U" device, Doctor Octopus' return, and another superhuman civil war, and the rise of the monsters. Catching Scorpio off guard, Spider-Man punched Scorpio into the doorway and locked it up. As Spider-Man suspects that Scorpio will have been teleported one year into the future, this would give S.H.I.E.L.D. time to prepare for Scorpio's return.

Solo Zodiac
A solo character called Zodiac stars in a self-titled limited series as part of the Dark Reign storyline. The character is obsessed with dominating the criminal underworld. He ends up gaining allies in the Clown II, the Death Reaper, Manslaughter Marsdale, and the Trapster. After they commit mass murder on 100 H.A.M.M.E.R. Agents, Zodiac eventually retrieves the Zodiac Key from S.H.I.E.L.D.

Zodiac later makes plans for a series of impressive-sounding schemes to put into motion in the near future.

It is later revealed that Zodiac was the mysterious benefactor of the Young Masters. When Egghead II is the only one that has not left the group, Zodiac recruits him into his villain army.

Great Wheel of Zodiac
A short-lived Zodiac team known as The Great Wheel was revealed to have existed back in 1961. The team was formed by a time traveling Leonardo da Vinci who takes on the Aries mantle. He recruits members that fill out different nations and organizations with the intent to perform certain missions in exchange for special acquirements that could be used for their personal battles. The rest of the Zodiac members consisted of Cornelius Van Lunt (Taurus), Nick Fury (Gemini), Jake Fury (Scorpio), Dum Dum Dugan (Libra), John Garrett (Aquarius), Daniel Whitehall (Leo), Wolfgang von Strucker (Sagittarius), Thomas Davidson (Virgo), Shoji Soma (Pisces), Vasili Dassaiev (Capricorn) and Viktor Uvarov (Cancer). After completing their missions and collecting the items needed, Dassaiev and Uvarov betrayed the members and stole them to enhance themselves. These events would lead into the creation of both HYDRA and Leviathan and S.H.I.E.L.D.'s creation of the Life Model Decoys.

Membership

First Zodiac members
 Taurus (leader) - Cornelius Van Lunt is a businessman and crime lord who is the founder of Zodiac and wears a bull costume.
 Aquarius - Darren Bentley is a crime lord and member of the Zodiac who had expert fighting skills.
 Aries - Marcus Lassiter is a criminal mastermind who wears ram horns on top of his helmet.
 Cancer - Jack Klevano is a criminal mastermind who wears a crab costume that have pincers that can grab anyone.
 Capricorn - Willard Weer is a crime lord who is an expert at martial arts and the horns on his head can extend to grab his opponents.
 Gemini - Joshua Link is a crime lord who can link his mind with his twin brother Sgt. Damian Link.
 Leo - Daniel Radford is a criminal mastermind that wears a lion costume that has claws on the gloves.
 Libra - Gustav Brandt is a blind crime lord, mercenary, and father of Mantis who is an expert at martial arts and has a psychic sense that helps him see.
 Pisces - Noah Perricone is a criminal mastermind who wears a special outfit designed for underwater combat.
 Sagittarius - Harlan Vargus is a crime lord who is skilled at hand-to-hand combat.
 Scorpio - Jake Fury is the brother of Nick Fury. He later created the second Zodiac which slaughtered most of the original Zodiac.
 Scorpio II - Jacques LaPoint is a criminal mastermind who was brought in to replace Jake Fury as Scorpio.
 Virgo - Elaine McLaughlin is a criminal mastermind who is skilled at hand-to-hand combat.

Second Zodiac members
 Scorpio (leader)
 Aquarius - An android who carries a gun that shoots electricity and water.
 Aries - An android that possesses ram horns on its head. Its second form had armor and fired lasers from its horns.
 Cancer - An android that possesses an armored shell. Its second form can release powerful jets of water from its hands. Its third form has pincers in place of hands.
 Capricorn - An android with goat-like horns. Its second form is an expert climber and possessed glider wings for flight. Its third form is more female-like with fur on it and gained goat-like hooves for feet.
 Gemini - An android that possesses multiple personalities, can release two duplicates of itself where the white duplicate fires energy blasts and the black duplicate has an electrical touch, expand its form, and possess super-strength. Its second form can fly and release blasts of energy.
 Leo - An android that possessed claws and super-strength. Its second body was designed to resemble Tigra complete with her abilities.
 Libra - An android that can fly and become intangible. In its second form, it can only fly.
 Pisces - An android that can survive underwater where it possessed fins, gills, and scales. Its second form possesses enhanced strength and durability. Its third form enables it to produce a watery mist from its body.
 Sagittarius - An android equipped with wrist-mounted crossbows that fire different arrows. Its second form was constructed to resemble Hawkeye.
 Taurus - An android equipped with retractable horns on his wrists attached to cables can be fired at opponents and can detect heat and organics. Its second form possesses super-strength enhanced strength and immunity to heat.
 Virgo - An android with energy-siphoning abilities.

Third Zodiac members
 Scorpius (leader) - He had a barbed tail as part of his costume.
 Aquarius - He can fire beams of unidentified energy from his hands.
 Aries - He possessed ram horns on his helmet, possesses super-strength, and wielded a gun.
 Cancer - A crab-like member possessed super-strength, wore armor, and attacks with his pincers.
 Capricorn - He possesses super-strength, attacks with his horns, and wielded a gun.
 Gemini - Two men where one of them was a mind-controlled Madison Jeffries. It is unknown what powers the "twin" had.
 Leo - A lion-like member who possesses super-strength, attacks with his claws and fangs, and wielded a gun.
 Libra - He wielded a staff and an energy-charged sword.
 Pisces - She can generate, control, and turn into water.
 Sagittarius - A bow-wielding centaur and lover of Pisces whose arrows can pierce armored opponents and sometimes carries a gun.
 Taurus - A huge humanoid cattle who possessed super-strength.
 Virgo - The girlfriend of Scorpio who wields guns and bows.

Fourth Zodiac members
 Aquarius - A Japanese woman.
 Aries - A German man.
 Cancer - An Israeli woman.
 Leo - A Nigerian man.
 Libra - An American woman.
 Pisces - A Russian man.
 Sagittarius - A French woman.
 Taurus - A Mexican man.
 Virgo - An American woman.

Members of Thanos' Zodiac
 Thanos (leader)
 Aquarius - A man who wears a special super-suit provided by Thanos that enables him to assume a watery substance of unknown origin that can control water.
 Aries - A man who wore a special super-suit provided by Thanos which gave him super-strength and enabled him to assume the form of a humanoid ram.
 Cancer - The identity of Hood's cousin John King who wore a special super-suit provided by Thanos that gives him the appearance of a humanoid crab.
 Capricorn - A man with a goatee.
 Gemini - An Asian man.
 Leo - A bearded man with long blonde hair who wears a special suit provided by Thanos that enables him to assume the form of a humanoid lion. During his fight with Hulk, Leo died of a heart attack.
 Libra - A red-haired woman.
 Pisces - A blonde-haired man who wears a special suit provided by Thanos that enables him to assume a fish-like appearance.
 Sagittarius - A man with a moustache.
 Scorpio - A man with a half-burned face.
 Taurus - An African-American man who wears a special super-suit provided by Thanos which enables him to possess super-strength and transform into a Minotaur-like form.
 Virgo - A brown-haired woman who wears a special suit provided by Thanos that transforms her into a winged female with a fiery head.

Members of the Zodiac Sects
 Scorpio (leader) - The identity of Vernon Fury.
 Aquarius - A member of the Zodiac with hydrokinesis supposedly provided by her gauntlets.
 Aries - A ram-masked member of the Zodiac.
 Cancer - A crab-masked member of the Zodiac.
 Capricorn - A member of the Zodiac with goat-like horns on his mask.
 Gemini - Two female members of the Zodiac where one of them is looped from the future and having the knowledge of the future for 24 hours.
 Leo - A lion-masked member of the Zodiac.
 Libra - A female member of the Zodiac.
 Pisces - A fish-masked member of the Zodiac.
 Sagittarius - A member of the Zodiac who is an expert archer.
 Taurus - A bull-armored member of the Zodiac.
 Virgo - A member of the Zodiac.

Other versions

Ultimate Marvel
In the pages of Ultimate Spider-Man from the Ultimate Marvel imprint, the Zodiac Key has been sought after by both Wilson Fisk, and Mysterio.

In other media
 Zodiac appears in The Avengers: United They Stand, led by Taurus and consisting of aliens based on their namesake astrological signs who seek to obtain the Zodiac Key.
 Zodiac appears in Marvel Anime: Iron Man, consisting of Ho Yinsen, who was influenced by Zodiac after losing his family to war and wears stolen Iron Man Dio armor; Dr. Chika Tanaka, a scientist and close associate of Tony Stark's who was brainwashed into becoming their sleeper agent Gemini; the organization's mysterious leader Kuroda, Japan's Minister of Defense; Professor Michelini, a disgruntled scientist that Tanaka worked with whose abandoned research on weather control was incorporated into their Aries mech; Kawashima, a disabled racecar driver who controls a Taurus mech; Sho, a boy who digitized his mind in the form of the Pisces computer virus; and Aki, a young telekinetic girl who Zodiac captured and made into the power source for the Virgo mech. This version of the group is a terrorist organization affiliated with A.I.M. that employs advanced technology based on the astrological symbols, such as Scorpio, Cancer, Aquarius, and Sagittarius-themed mechs, among others, as well as energy weapons, mind control technology, and cybernetics. Throughout the series, Zodiac launches terrorist attacks on Japan to keep Iron Man distracted from their efforts to take control of his new Arc Station, which was meant to supply free energy to the world, and use its power to fuel a coup d'état within Japan's government so Kuroda can take over Japan and rebuild it as a militarized nation to dominate the world. Eventually, Kuroda reveals his and Tanaka's involvement with Zodiac, activates her Gemini armor, and forces her to attack Iron Man while Kuroda siphons energy from the Arc Station to power his Rasetsu armor. However, she breaks free of her programming and sacrifices herself to sever the connection, allowing Iron Man to defeat Kuroda.
 Zodiac appears in Ultimate Spider-Man, led by Max Fury / Scorpio and consisting of Taurus, Aries, and Leo-inspired foot soldiers who wear masks based on their respective astrological symbol.

References

External links
 Zodiac (disambiguation) at Marvel.com
 Zodiac I at Marvel.com
 Zodiac II at Marvel.com
 Zodiac III at Marvel.com
 Zodiac (unrevealed) at Marvel.com
 AlphaFlight.Net Alphanex Entry on - Zodiac
 
 
 
 
 

Characters created by Keith Giffen
Characters created by Roy Thomas
Characters created by Sal Buscema
Comics characters introduced in 1970
Fictional organized crime groups
Marvel Comics robots
Marvel Comics supervillain teams